Kashanak or Keshanak may refer to:

Kashanak, Isfahan
Kashanak, North Khorasan
Kashanak, Tehran